Ouled Rafaa (also written Ouled Raffa) is a village in the commune of Ouled Khoudir, in Ouled Khoudir District, Béchar Province, Algeria. It is connected to Ouled Khoudir by a local road along the side of the river, along with the other village of El Ksar.

References

Neighbouring towns and cities

Populated places in Béchar Province